John Charles Quinlan (January 23, 1927 – March 19, 1965) was an American sportscaster. He was best known for doing radio play-by-play for the Chicago Cubs, first on WIND (1955-56) and then on WGN- (1957–64). His broadcast partners were Lou Boudreau (1957–April 1960, 1961–64) and Charlie Grimm April–October 1960).

Quinlan was killed in an auto accident after leaving a golf outing during spring training of 1965. He was an avid golfer, and a charity golf tournament in his name has been held in the Chicago area ever since.

Quinlan's classic call of the final out of Don Cardwell's no-hitter on May 15, 1960, transcribed from a phonograph record of Cubs history issued in 1971, is quoted below. The batter for the opposing St. Louis Cardinals is Joe Cunningham. The Cubs left fielder is Walt "Moose" Moryn. (See also Jack Brickhouse for TV-vs.-radio style comparison.)

Quinlan was named Illinois Sportscaster of the Year by the National Sportscasters and Sportswriters Association four straight years from 1961 to 1964. Nationally, he broadcast the first 1960 All-Star Game and the 1960 World Series for NBC Radio. He also called Big Ten football on WGN and broadcast the 1963 NFL Championship Game locally as a substitute for regular Bears radio announcer Brickhouse, who was calling the game on NBC television.

Two audio books "Jack Quinlan/Forgotten Greatness" Parts I and II were produced by broadcaster Ron Barber and include every known remaining clip of Quinlan's play-by-play and are part of Barber's continuing effort to gain Quinlan consideration for election to the Baseball Broadcasters' Hall of Fame. Rare photos and additional information on Jack Quinlan are available on Facebook at Jack Quinlan Cubs Broadcaster.

External links
WGN Radio's Jack Quinlan page

1927 births
1965 deaths
American radio sports announcers
Chicago Bears announcers
Chicago Cubs announcers
College football announcers
Major League Baseball broadcasters
People from Peoria, Illinois
Road incident deaths in Arizona
University of Notre Dame alumni